Riad Mousa al-Asaad (born 2 February 1961) is a Syrian military commander, politician who is the founding leader of the Free Syrian Army. One of the prominent faces of the Syrian Revolution, he led the armed resistance to the Assad regime as commander-in-chief of FSA, during the early phase of the Syrian Civil War. Under Riad al-Asaad's command, FSA expanded into a para-military force of 75,000 guerillas and insurgents in March 2012; capable of ousting regime forces from Damascus. He currently serves as the Deputy Prime Minister for Military Affairs of the Syrian Salvation Government, a position he has held since 2 November 2017. He was a former Colonel in the Syrian Air Force who defected to the opposition in July 2011 and became the first Acting Commander-in-chief of the Free Syrian Army.

A number of his family members were executed by the regime of Bashar al-Assad. Despite the similar English spelling of surname, he is not a member of, nor related with, Syria's ruling al-Assad family.

Establishment of the Free Syrian Army 
Following the outbreak of violence in Syria in March 2011, Colonel Riad al-Asaad announced his defection from the Syrian Air Force on 4 July 2011. He initially joined the Free Officers Movement after this defection.

On 29 July 2011, al-Asaad along with other defectors declared the establishment of the Free Syrian Army, with the intention of fighting an insurgent war to overthrow the government of Bashar al-Assad. Colonel Asaad opposes any exile solution for Syrian  president Bashar al-Assad, and seeks for fighting until his government is overthrown.

On 22 September 2012, the Free Syrian Army (FSA) announced that it had moved its command centre from Turkey to liberated areas inside Syria. Alongside other military commanders of the FSA, Riad al-Asaad also hinted plans for initiating an offensive on Damascus, stating: "To the Syrian people, its freedom fighters and all the armed factions, we are glad to let you know that the leadership of the FSA has moved into Syria following arrangements made with other brigades that included securing liberated areas with the hope of launching the offensive on Damascus."

UN ceasefire attempt 2012 
After UN military observers entered Syria, al-Asa'ad announced a ceasefire for all forces, committed to the Kofi Annan peace plan for Syria. However, after a few days he has reannounced continuation of attacks led by rebels because the government of Bashar al-Assad, according to him, did not make peace as promised. On 31 May 2012, al-Asa'ad urged Kofi Annan to scrap his peace plan which he claims failed.

Position within the Free Syrian Army 
Colonel Kasim Saaduddin, a member of the FSA, stated that al-Asaad does not have control over the Free Syrian Army, which al-Asaad himself denied in the interview.

On 8 December 2012, in Antalya, Turkey, Asaad was replaced by Brigadier General Salim Idris as effective military commander of the Free Syrian Army.

Criticism from opposition protesters 
Riad al-Asaad has received criticism from some opposition protesters in the city of Salamiyah. A protest on 3 August 2012 claimed that "Mr. General Riad al-Asaad, while our city protested for the first time, you were working for Assad's regime".

Assassination attempts 
In an interview with the Voice of Russia made in early August 2012, al-Asaad claimed that the Syrian government attempted to assassinate him several times and for that reason, he is being guarded by the Turkish intelligence.

On 25 March 2013, he was the victim of a car bomb explosion near Mayadin, in eastern Syria. He was taken to Turkey for treatment, where his right leg was amputated. In his 2015 book, The Syrian Jihad, analyst Charles Lister cites a "senior Ahrar al-Sham leader" as telling him the rebel group had "secretly traced the assassination attempt on Riad al-Asaad back to Jabhat al-Nusra."

Syrian Salvation Government
In late August 2017, Riad al-Asaad attended a conference in Idlib, held by Tahrir al-Sham, which established the Syrian Salvation Government on 2 November. Riad al-Assad said that "Tahrir al-Sham has previously declared that it will be dissolve itself, which is an external and internal demand". He said that they "did not attend the conference and we did not communicate with them after it ended, either". However, the Hawar Kilis Operations Room, part of the Turkish-backed Free Syrian Army, condemned al-Asaad and accused him of conspiring with al-Qaeda.

On 2 November 2017, Riad al-Asaad was appointed Deputy Prime Minister for Military Affairs of the Syrian Salvation Government (a de facto alternative government of the Syrian opposition).

Opinions 
Riad al-Asaad has made controversial statements such as suggesting that suicide bombing is "an integral part of revolutionary action, of Free Syrian Army action."

In an undated video uploaded on 26 March 2013, Colonel Riad al-Asaad defended al-Nusra Front, describing them as, "our brothers in Islam". As part of the interview, he asserted that the FSA had provided direct support for al-Nusra in order to aid their fight against the Ba'ath government.

In a 2016 interview with Turkish daily newspaper Yeni Şafak, Asaad said that the Democratic Union Party (PYD) was more dangerous than ISIL, adding that ISIL was a temporary fraction in the area while the PYD is a cause of permanent devastation which brings long term crisis to the region. He asserted that the existence of PYD and ISIL violence was connected with the continuation of the Assad regime and that extremism in Syria would be vanished if Assad left power. He stated that the PYD and its armed wing People's Protection Units (YPG) aimed to establish a separate Kurdish state in northern Syria but it would not be possible. The group, he said, was spreading hatred among Turkmens, Arabs, Alawites and Kurds living in the area. He also asserted that the group, which claims to defend Kurds, both was supported by the U.S. military and regime forces, had killed hundreds of Arabs, Turkmens, and even Kurds who opposed their Marxist-Socialist strategy. "U.S. is equally responsible as Assad, Russia and Iran for killing hundreds of thousands of civilians in Syria," the FSA commander said. He stated that PYD was a plan of U.S. and Europe to sabotage Syrian people's resistance especially the Free Syrian Army.

References

External links
 

1961 births
Living people
Syrian colonels
Syrian Air Force personnel
Defectors to the Free Syrian Army
Syrian Sunni Muslims
Syrian amputees
Place of birth missing (living people)